CU Coventry is a subsidiary of Coventry University. It has been in operation since 2012, and was formerly known as Coventry University College. Its campus is located in the city of Coventry, England.

It is part of CU, a network of three higher education campuses, comprising CU Coventry, CU London and CU Scarborough, all part of the Coventry University Group.

History 
Coventry University College was founded in 2012 as a subsidiary of Coventry University, taking on its new name CU Coventry in 2017. The institution is labelled as a "no frills", alternative to traditional higher education. Students that graduate with a degree receive it from Coventry University, which is recognised by the UK government as the awarding body. It has a range of short courses called Connect to help people access university, and hosts community events.

Higher Education courses

Access to Higher Education courses are offered, designed to help students access higher education without traditional qualifications:
 Business Studies
 Engineering
 Health & Human Sciences
 Social Sciences
 Law and Practice
 Tourism & Hospitality Management

References

External links 

 

Coventry University
2012 establishments in the United Kingdom